In the 2008–09 season, UD Almería played in two competitions: La Liga and the Copa del Rey. It was their second season in the top flight since promotion from the 2006–07 Segunda División.

Squad
Retrieved on 14 December 2020

Out on loan

Almería B players

Retrieved on 15 December 2020

Transfers

In

Out

 López Rekarte was subsequently signed by Eibar in March 2009.

Player statistics

Squad stats 
Last updated on 7 December 2020.

|-
|colspan="14"|Players who have left the club after the start of the season:

|}

Top Scorers
Updated on 11 December 2020

Disciplinary Record
Updated on 15 December 2020

Season Results

Preseason

La Liga

Results summary

Matches

Copa del Rey

Round of 32

Almería won 5–1 on aggregate

Round of 16

Real Mallorca won 4–2 on aggregate

References

Almeria
UD Almería seasons